Glutamate-1-semialdehyde is a molecule formed from by the reduction of tRNA bound glutamate, catalyzed by glutamyl-tRNA reductase. It is isomerized by glutamate-1-semialdehyde 2,1-aminomutase to give aminolevulinic acid in the biosynthesis of porphyrins, including heme and chlorophyll.

See also
 Glutamate-5-semialdehyde

References

Amino acids
Aldehydes